The Butterworth–Seberang Jaya Toll Road, Federal Route 4 is a 5-km non-expressway-standard toll road in Penang, Malaysia. It connects Butterworth city centre to Seberang Jaya, a township at the eastern outskirt of Butterworth. This toll road is maintained by Lingkaran Butterworth (Penang) Sdn. Bhd. as a part of the Butterworth Outer Ring Road E17 project.

Many maps have mistakenly labelled this toll highway as a part of the neighbouring Butterworth–Kulim Expressway E15; however, it is incorrect as this highway is not maintained by PLUS Malaysia Berhad but rather by the operator of the Butterworth Outer Ring Road.

Toll rates

Sungai Nyior toll plaza

''(Starting 6.00 am on 15 October 2015)'

List of interchanges

Below is a list of interchanges, intersections and laybys along the Butterworth–Seberang Jaya Toll Road. The entire highway is built as a six-lane divided expressway with the speed limit of 60 km/h and is located within the district of Seberang Perai Tengah, Penang.

See also
 Federal Route 4
 Butterworth Outer Ring Road
 Butterworth–Kulim Expressway

External links
 Lingkaran Luar Butterworth Sdn Bhd (LLB) website

Expressways and highways in Penang
Malaysian Federal Roads
Highways in Malaysia
Roads in Penang